The Dropper is an album by avant-jazz-funk organ trio Medeski, Martin & Wood.

The album peaked at No. 2 on the Billboard Jazz Albums chart.

Critical reception
The Washington Post wrote: "In many ways the chaotic and funk-soul soundscapes on MMW's The Dropper are not avant-garde but downright conservative, coming 40 years after the advent of organ jazz and 30 after free jazz." Exclaim! called The Dropper "their crankiest, most difficult album to date, as they wade into pointy-headed jazz-funk realms, but that's only because they've burrowed more deeply still into the funk." The Riverfront Times thought that "Medeski's particularly compelling in his style, banging on keyboards with a precise recklessness, and he expands his keyboard army by, it seems, dozens of instruments."

Track listing
"We Are Rolling" – 7:04
"Big Time" – 3:23
"Fèlic" – 3:21
"Partido Alto" – 5:42
"Illinization" – 2:31
"Bone Digger" – 2:22
"Note Bleu" – 3:01
"The Dropper" – 3:29
"Philly Cheese Blunt" – 4:49
"Sun Sleigh" – 2:23
"Tsukemono" – 3:23
"Shacklyn Knights" – 4:44
"Norah 6" – 4:51

Performers
John Medeski – keyboards
Billy Martin – drums, percussion
Chris Wood – basses
Marshall Allen – alto sax
Marc Ribot – guitars
Eddie Bobe – congas
Paula Potocki – surdo
Charlie Burnham – violin
Joan Wasser – violin
Jane Scarpantoni – cello

Credits
Engineered and mixed by Scotty Hard (except "Illinization", mixed by David Baker)
Assisted at Shacklyn by Phillip Harvey
Assisted at Greene Street Studios by Phil Painson
Mastered by Howie Weinberg at Masterdisk (NYC)
Assisted at Masterdisk by Andy Van Dette
Photography: Danny Clinch
Art direction and design: Chippy

References

2000 albums
Blue Note Records albums
Jazz fusion albums by American artists
Medeski Martin & Wood albums